Eringhem is a commune in the Nord department and Hauts-de-France region of northern France.

Located about halfway between Dunkirk and Saint-Omer in the historical region of French Westhoek, its West Flemish name is Eringem.

The village churchyard contains the graves of three Royal Air Force men killed in action in May 1940, among them Pilot Officer Sir Arnold Talbot Wilson.

Population

History
Eringhem is first mentioned in documents dating from the 9th century, at which time it was known as Ebersingahem, meaning the homestead of Eberso's people. Until the French Revolution, the settlement belonged to the castellany of Bourbourg. A papal bull issued by Pope Paschal II in 1113 confirmed the Count of Flanders' grant of the land to the Abbey of Bourbourg. In the 12th century, the Count of Guînes founded a convent at Eringhem. The château of Eringhem is mentioned as belonging to Louis of Luxembourg in 1458.

Heraldry

See also
Communes of the Nord department

References

Communes of Nord (French department)
French Flanders